A roundoff error, also called rounding error, is the difference between the result produced by a given algorithm using exact arithmetic and the result produced by the same algorithm using finite-precision, rounded arithmetic. Rounding errors are due to inexactness in the representation of real numbers and the arithmetic operations done with them. This is a form of quantization error. When using approximation equations or algorithms, especially when using finitely many digits to represent real numbers (which in theory have infinitely many digits), one of the goals of numerical analysis is to estimate computation errors. Computation errors, also called numerical errors, include both truncation errors and roundoff errors.

When a sequence of calculations with an input involving any roundoff error are made, errors may accumulate, sometimes dominating the calculation. In ill-conditioned problems, significant error may accumulate.

In short, there are two major facets of roundoff errors involved in numerical calculations:
 The ability of computers to represent both magnitude and precision of numbers is inherently limited.
 Certain numerical manipulations are highly sensitive to roundoff errors. This can result from both mathematical considerations as well as from the way in which computers perform arithmetic operations.

Representation error 

The error introduced by attempting to represent a number using a finite string of digits is a form of roundoff error called representation error. Here are some examples of representation error in decimal representations:

Increasing the number of digits allowed in a representation reduces the magnitude of possible roundoff errors, but any representation limited to finitely many digits will still cause some degree of roundoff error for uncountably many real numbers. Additional digits used for intermediary steps of a calculation are known as guard digits.

Rounding multiple times can cause error to accumulate. For example, if 9.945309 is rounded to two decimal places (9.95), then rounded again to one decimal place (10.0), the total error is 0.054691. Rounding 9.945309 to one decimal place (9.9) in a single step introduces less error (0.045309). This can occur, for example, when software performs arithmetic in x86 80-bit floating-point and then rounds the result to IEEE 754 binary64 floating-point.

Floating-point number system 

Compared with the fixed-point number system, the floating-point number system is more efficient in representing real numbers so it is widely used in modern computers. While the real numbers  are infinite and continuous, a floating-point number system  is finite and discrete. Thus, representation error, which leads to roundoff error, occurs under the floating-point number system.

Notation of floating-point number system 
A floating-point number system  is characterized by  integers:
: base or radix
: precision

Any  has the following form: 

Normalized floating-number system 

 A floating-point number system is normalized if the leading digit  is always nonzero unless the number is zero. Thus, the normalized form of a nonzero IEEE floating-point number is  where . In binary, the leading digit is always  so it is not written out and is called the implicit bit. This gives an extra bit of precision so that the roundoff error caused by representation error is reduced.
 Since floating-point number system  is finite and discrete, it cannot represent all real numbers which means infinite real numbers can only be approximated by some finite numbers through rounding rules. The floating-point approximation of a given real number  by  can be denoted.
 The total number of normalized floating-point numbers is  where
  counts choice of sign, being positive or negative
  counts choice of the leading digit
  counts remaining mantissa
  counts choice of exponents

IEEE standard 

In the IEEE standard the base is binary, i.e. , and normalization is used. The IEEE standard stores the sign, exponent, and mantissa in separate fields of a floating point word, each of which has a fixed width (number of bits). The two most commonly used levels of precision for floating-point numbers are single precision and double precision.

Machine epsilon 

Machine epsilon can be used to measure the level of roundoff error in the floating-point number system. Here are two different definitions.

 The machine epsilon, denoted , is the maximum possible absolute relative error in representing a nonzero real number  in a floating-point number system. 
 The machine epsilon, denoted , is the smallest number  such that . Thus,  whenever .

Roundoff error under different rounding rules 

There are two common rounding rules, round-by-chop and round-to-nearest. The IEEE standard uses round-to-nearest.

 This rounding rule is biased because it always moves the result toward zero.
When there is a tie, the floating-point number whose last stored digit is even (also, the last digit, in binary form, is equal to 0) is used. 
 This rounding rule is more accurate but more computationally expensive. 
 Rounding so that the last stored digit is even when there is a tie ensures that it is not rounded up or down systematically. This is to try to avoid the possibility of an unwanted slow drift in long calculations due simply to a biased rounding.
 The following example illustrates the level of roundoff error under the two rounding rules. The rounding rule, round-to-nearest, leads to less roundoff error in general.

Calculating roundoff error in IEEE standard 

Suppose the usage of round-to-nearest and IEEE double precision.

 Example: the decimal number  can be rearranged into  
Since the 53-rd bit to the right of the binary point is a 1 and is followed by other nonzero bits, the round-to-nearest rule requires rounding up, that is, add 1 bit to the 52-nd bit. Thus, the normalized floating-point representation in IEEE standard of 9.4 is 

This representation is derived by discarding the infinite tail  
from the right tail and then added  in the rounding step. 
Then . 

Measuring roundoff error by using machine epsilon 

The machine epsilon  can be used to measure the level of roundoff error when using the two rounding rules above. Below are the formulas and corresponding proof. The first definition of machine epsilon is used here.

Theorem 
 Round-by-chop: 
 Round-to-nearest:

Proof 
Since round-by-chop is being used, it is

In order to determine the maximum of this quantity, the is a need to find the maximum of the numerator and the minimum of the denominator. Thus, . Therefore,  for round-by-chop.
The proof for round-to-nearest is similar.
 Note that the first definition of machine epsilon is not quite equivalent to the second definition when using the round-to-nearest rule but it is equivalent for round-by-chop.

Roundoff error caused by floating-point arithmetic 

Even if some numbers can be represented exactly by floating-point numbers and such numbers are called machine numbers, performing floating-point arithmetic may lead to roundoff error in the final result.

Addition 

Machine addition consists of lining up the decimal points of the two numbers to be added, adding them, and then storing the result again as a floating-point number. The addition itself can be done in higher precision but the result must be rounded back to the specified precision, which may lead to roundoff error.

This example shows that roundoff error can be introduced when adding a large number and a small number. The shifting of the decimal points in the mantissas to make the exponents match causes the loss of some of the less significant digits. The loss of precision may be described as absorption.

Note that the addition of two floating-point numbers will result in a roundoff error when their sum is an order of magnitude greater than that of the larger of the two.

 For example, consider a normalized floating-point number system with base  and precision . Note that  but .

This kind of error can occur alongside an absorption error in a single operation.

Multiplication 

In general, the product of 2p-digit mantissas contains up to 2p digits, so the result might not fit in the mantissa. Thus roundoff error will be involved in the result.

 For example, consider a normalized floating-point number system with the base  and the mantissa digits are at most . Note that  but  since there at most  mantissa digits. The roundoff error would be .

Division 

In general, the quotient of 2p-digit mantissas may contain more than p-digits.Thus roundoff error will be involved in the result.

 For example, if the normalized floating-point number system above is still being used, then  but . So, the tail  is cut off.

Subtraction 

Absorption also applies to subtraction.

The subtracting of two nearly equal numbers is called subtractive cancellation. 

 For example, let  and the second definition of machine epsilon is used here. What is the solution to ? However, in the floating-point number system, . Although  is easily big enough to be represented, both instances of  have been rounded away giving .

Even with a somewhat larger , the result is still significantly unreliable in typical cases.  There is not much faith in the accuracy of the value because the most uncertainty in any floating-point number is the digits on the far right. 

 For example, . The result  is clearly representable, but there is not much faith in it.

This is closely related to the phenomenon of catastrophic cancellation, in which the two numbers are known to be approximations.

Accumulation of roundoff error 

Errors can be magnified or accumulated when a sequence of calculations is applied on an initial input with roundoff error due to inexact representation.

Unstable algorithms 

An algorithm or numerical process is called stable if small changes in the input only produce small changes in the output and it is called unstable if large changes in the output are produced.

A sequence of calculations normally occur when running some algorithm. The amount of error in the result depends on the stability of the algorithm. Roundoff error will be magnified by unstable algorithms.

It is easy to show that . Then the algorithm does the following sequence of calculations. 

The roundoff error is amplified in succeeding calculations so this algorithm is unstable.

Ill-conditioned problems 

Even if a stable algorithm is used, the solution to a problem may still be inaccurate due to the accumulation of roundoff error when the problem itself is ill-conditioned.

The condition number of a problem is the ratio of the relative change in the solution to the relative change in the input. A problem is well-conditioned if small relative changes in input result in small relative changes in the solution. Otherwise, the problem is ill-conditioned. In other words, a problem is ill-conditioned if its condition number is "much larger" than 1.

The condition number is introduced as a measure of the roundoff errors that can result when solving ill-conditioned problems.

See also 
 Precision (arithmetic)
 Truncation
 Rounding
 Loss of significance
 Floating point
 Kahan summation algorithm
 Machine epsilon
 Wilkinson's polynomial

References

Further reading

External links 
 Roundoff Error at MathWorld.
 
 20 Famous Software Disasters

Numerical analysis

sv:Avrundningsfel